Baroševac is a village situated in Lazarevac municipality in Serbia.

References

External links 

Suburbs of Belgrade
Lazarevac